MobiCom, the International Conference on Mobile Computing and Networking, is a series of annual conferences sponsored by ACM SIGMOBILE dedicated to addressing the challenges in the areas of mobile computing and wireless and mobile networking. Although no rating system for computer networking conferences exists, MobiCom is generally considered to be the best conference in these areas, and it is the fifth highest-impact venue in all of Computer Science. The quality of papers published in this conference is very high. The acceptance rate of MobiCom typically around 10%, meaning that only one tenth of all submitted papers make it through the tough peer review filter.

According to SIGMOBILE, "the MobiCom conference series serves as the premier international forum addressing networks, systems, algorithms, and applications that support the symbiosis of mobile computers and wireless networks.  MobiCom is a highly selective conference focusing on all issues in mobile computing and wireless and mobile networking at the link layer and above."

MobiCom Conferences have been held at the following locations:

 MobiCom 2020, London, UK, 14-18 September 2020
 MobiCom 2019, Los Cabos, Mexico, 21-25 October 2019
 MobiCom 2018, New Delhi, India, 29 October-2 November 2018
 MobiCom 2017, Snowbird, United States, 16-20 October 2017
 MobiCom 2016, New York City, United States, 3–7 October 2016
 MobiCom 2015, Paris, France, 7–11 September 2015
 MobiCom 2014, Maui, Hawaii, United States, 7–11 September 2014
 MobiCom 2013, Miami, Florida, United States, 30 September-4 October 2013
 MobiCom 2012, Istanbul, Turkey, 22–26 August 2012
 MobiCom 2011, Las Vegas, Nevada, United States, 19–23 September 2011
 MobiCom 2010, Chicago, Illinois, United States, 20–24 September 2010
 MobiCom 2009, Beijing, China, 20–25 September 2009
 MobiCom 2008, San Francisco, California, United States, 13–19 September 2008
 MobiCom 2007, Montreal, Quebec, Canada, 9–14 September 2007
 MobiCom 2006, Los Angeles, California, United States, 23–29 September 2006
 MobiCom 2005, Cologne, Germany, 28 August-2 September 2005
 MobiCom 2004, Philadelphia, Pennsylvania, United States, 26 September-1 October 2004
 MobiCom 2003, San Diego, California, United States, 14–19 September 2003
 MobiCom 2002, Atlanta, Georgia, United States, 23–26 September 2002
 MobiCom 2001, Rome, Italy, 16–21 July 2001
 MobiCom 2000, Boston, Massachusetts, United States, 6–11 August 2000
 MobiCom '99, Seattle, Washington, United States, 15–20 August 1999
 MobiCom '98, Dallas, Texas, United States, 25–30 October 1998
 MobiCom '97, Budapest, Hungary, 26–30 September 1997
 MobiCom '96, Rye, New York, United States, 10–12 November 1996
 MobiCom '95, Berkeley, California, United States, 13–15 November 1995

References

External links
 SIGMOBILE
 MobiCom

Computer networking conferences